Cabanas de Tavira (Portuguese for "cottages/huts of Tavira") is a former civil parish in the municipality of Tavira, Portugal. In 2013, the parish merged into the new parish Conceição e Cabanas de Tavira. The parish covers an area of approximately 4.2 km², and encompasses a resident population of approximately 1181 inhabitants. Once a fishing port, it is now a popular summer tourist destination, owing to its beach (Praia de Cabanas) and island (Ilha de Cabanas), which belong to the Ria Formosa Nature Park.

History
The history of Cabanas is connected to the commercial tuna fishery. Around 1734, during the Armação dos Mares de Tavira, the first cabanas (cottages or fishing huts), important for storage and maintenance of equipment, as well as accommodating the fishers, were constructed. These huts were located along the beach, and the locals began to refer to them as the cabanas da armação (tackle huts). For over twenty years there were references to the cabanas, but usually referring to seasonal activities. The first birth in the area was outside the fishing season, around 1757, and the following year, the municipal council conceded the first land tenure in the Cabanas de Armação. 
Following this date the first inhabitants began to construct permanent residences in the area.

Cabanas de Tavira is a young civil parish in the municipality of Tavira, de-annexed from the neighbouring parish of Conceição on 20 June 1997. Its seat, in the village of Cabanas, was elevated to the status of vila or town, on 19 April 2001.

Geography

The parish's northern border follows the western railway until slightly after it crosses the E.N.125 motorway; its eastern frontier follows the Ribeiro do Lacém to the coast; the western border also follows a tributary, the Ribeira do Almargem; while the parish fronts the Atlantic Ocean by way of its island.

Cabanas is a long line of low-rise shops, bars and cafés facing the Ria Formosa with several hotel and apartment complexes scattered around the outskirts of the town. In addition to the parish seat, the territory is constituted by several individual places, such as Gorgulho, Canadinha, Canada, Arrancada, Pocinho de Oliveira, Gomeira, Barroquinha, Barroca, Morgadinho, Morgado, Baleeira and Lacém.

Although the population is relatively small, this number expands considerably during the summer period, due to a large influx of tourists and beach-goers.

Economy

Moored fishing boats line the seafront, although the town's economy has drifted mainly towards tourism rather than fishing in recent years. Ever associated with the fishery, in 1973, Cabanas created its first tourist-oriented business. Pedras da Rainha (Queens Rocks), as it was known, provided the first local employment, and over time, it began to look to tourism as an alternative industry to the primary sector. While the fishery is still a considerable part of the economy, by the end of the 20th century, the tourist sector had become the innovator of development in the small parish. Annually, thousands of visitors come to the region to entertain themselves with rich patrimony, including the Ria Formosa Nature Park and the approximately seven kilometres of beaches, dunes and crystalline waters. Supporting these ventures, the local government has maintained a tourist-orient quality of life, with consecutive Blue Flag designations since 1989, for beach water quality.

Transport
Several buses routinely link the municipal seat (Tavira) to Cabanas daily. The nearest raillink is in nearby Conceição which is on the Tavira to Vila Real line.

Access to the popular beach is by water taxi from several points along the harbor area: the water taxis are small outboard boats operated by local watermen and by at least one company. Each boat may be identified by colored flags on their sterns.

Architecture

Military
 Fort of São João da Barra

Religious
 Church of Nossa Senhora do Mar

In the arts

Cinema
Some outdoors scenes for movies were recorded here. These were:
 Almadraba Atuneira (1961)  
 Hovering Over the Water (1986)
 Água e Sal (2001)

References

External links 
Cabanas de Tavira photos hosted on Flickr 
Cabanas de Tavira - Tavira Guide

Former parishes of Tavira